Yog or YOG may refer to:

People
 Yog Japee (fl. from 2003), Indian actor
 Yog Joy (1938–1996), Indian photojournalist
 Yog Raj Sharma (born 1950), Indian ophthalmologist
 Yog Sysop, nickname of James D. Macdonald (born 1954), American author and critic who coined "Yog's Law"

Other uses
 Yog: Monster From Space, U.S. release of Space Amoeba, a 1970 kaiju film
 Youth Olympic Games, an international multi-sport event
 Ogoki Post Airport, in Ontario Canada, IATA code YOG
 YOG, prefix for a Type B ship, an American gasoline barge

See also

 Yoga (Sanskrit: योग), a group of physical, mental, and spiritual practices or disciplines which originated in ancient India 
 Yoga (disambiguation)
 Yog-Sothoth, a fictional entity in the Cthulhu Mythos of H. P. Lovecraft
 Yogh, Middle English letter ȝ
 Yogi (disambiguation)